North Wilbraham station was located on Old Boston Post Road at Chapel Street in North Wilbraham, Massachusetts. The Western Railroad opened through Wilbraham in October 1839; it later became part of the Boston and Albany Railroad. Service to North Wilbraham and other intermediate stations on the line ended before 1960, through Amtrak's Lake Shore Limited still operates over the tracks.

External links
 Joe's Wilbraham Photo History Page
 Merrick History of Wilbraham

Railway stations in Hampden County, Massachusetts
Former railway stations in Massachusetts
Former Boston and Albany Railroad stations